Dan Thompson (born June 15, 1956) was a Canadian swimmer.  He competed in the butterfly events during the 1970s and early 1980s. He was supposed to represent his native country at the 1980 Summer Olympics, but didn't start due to the international boycott of the Moscow Olympic Games. He won two silver medals at the 1979 Pan American Games.

See also
 List of Commonwealth Games medallists in swimming (men)

References
 

1956 births
Living people
Canadian male butterfly swimmers
Sportspeople from Ontario
Place of birth missing (living people)
Swimmers at the 1978 Commonwealth Games
Swimmers at the 1979 Pan American Games
Commonwealth Games medallists in swimming
Commonwealth Games gold medallists for Canada
Pan American Games medalists in swimming
Pan American Games silver medalists for Canada
Universiade medalists in swimming
Universiade silver medalists for Canada
Medalists at the 1977 Summer Universiade
Medalists at the 1979 Pan American Games
Medallists at the 1978 Commonwealth Games